The 1920 World Hard Court Championships (WHCC) (French: Championnats du Monde de Tennis sur Terre Battue) was the fourth edition of the World Hard Court Championships tennis tournament, considered as the precursor to the French Open, and was held on the clay courts of the Stade Français at the Parc de Saint-Cloud in Paris from 22 until 30 May 1920. Organised by L'Union des Sociétés Française De Sports Athlétiques, the Championships had been suspended in the prior five years due to World War I, and thus this was the first edition held since 1914.

Finals

Men's singles

 William Laurentz defeated  André Gobert, 9–7, 6–2, 3–6, 6–2

Women's singles

 Dorothy Holman defeated  Francisca Subirana, 6–0, 7–5

Men's doubles

 André Gobert /  William Laurentz defeated  Cecil Blackbeard /  Nicolae Mişu, 6–4, 6–2, 6–1

Women's doubles

 Dorothy Holman /  Phyllis Satterthwaite defeated  Germaine Golding /  Jeanne Vaussard, 6–3, 6–1

Mixed doubles

 William Laurentz /  Germaine Golding defeated  Max Decugis /  Suzanne Amblard, walkover

References

External links
 
 

World Hard Court Championships
World Hard Court Championships
World Hard Court Championships
May 1920 sports events
1920 in French tennis